Halma (1892–1909) was an American Thoroughbred racehorse who won the 1895 Kentucky Derby. He is best known for being the first Kentucky Derby winner to sire a Kentucky Derby winner.

Background
Halma was bred in Kentucky by Eastin & Larabie, a racing and breeding partnership created in 1886 between Montana banker and financier Samuel E. Larabie and Augustus Eastin, a wealthy Kentucky businessman. He was sired by Hanover, a three-time Leading sire in North America and a U.S. Racing Hall of Fame inductee. Grandsire Hindoo, was a Champion runner who also was inducted in the U.S. Racing Hall of Fame. Halma was out of the mare Julia L., a daughter of Champion and Hall of Famer, Longfellow. He was purchased as a yearling by Byron McClelland, who trained his own racing stable.

Racing career
Halma got his first win under African American jockey Alonzo Clayton on August 26, 1894, at New York's Sheepshead Bay Race Track. At age three, with 15-year-old African American James "Soup" Perkins up, Halma won the Phoenix Hotel Stakes, then on May 3, 1895, only three days later, again ridden by Perkins, he won the last Kentucky Derby to be held at the race's original 1½ mile distance.  On May 14, under Perkins (who would be America's leading rider that year with 192 wins), he won the Clark Handicap  shortly after which McClelland sold him to wealthy businessman Charles Fleischmann for a reported $30,000. Two days after Fleischmann purchased Halma, the colt won the May 21, 1895 Latonia Derby. An injury kept him out of racing in the summer and fall of 1895, and in 1896 he went lame and was retired to stud.

Stud career
Halma stood at stud in the United States where he notably sired Alan-a-Dale (b. 1899), winner of the 1902 Kentucky Derby. Halma was the first Derby winner to sire a Derby winner. In June 1901 Charles Fleischmann sold him to American sportsman, William Kissam Vanderbilt who shipped him to his Haras du Quesnay stud farm in France.

In France, Halma's best runner was Oversight (b. 1906), a top colt at age competing at two to four whose wins included the Prix de la Salamandre, Prix du President de la Republique, and Prix Lupin.

Halma died in 1909 at age seventeen.

Pedigree

Sire line tree

Halma
Alan-a-Dale
Barnsdale
Smart Set
Acacia
Oversight
Mirebeau
Insight

References

1892 racehorse births
1909 racehorse deaths
Racehorses bred in Kentucky
Racehorses trained in the United States
Kentucky Derby winners
Thoroughbred family 4-r
Byerley Turk sire line